Midnapore Collegiate School, formerly Governmental Zilla School, established on 14th November 1834, is one of the oldest schools in Bengal as well as India. The students and teachers of this school made contributions to Indian Freedom Movement during the British Rule. Kshudiram Bose, a martyr in the freedom struggle was one of the students of the school. Some other alumni of the institution are Bankim Chandra Chattopadhyay, Manik Bandopadhyay. Brahmo Samaj leader Wrishi Rajnarayan Basu as headmasters had also contributed in building up the institution. It was formerly the Zilla School of Midnapore (currently Paschim Medinipur) in West Bengal. The school campus has a basketball court and science labs.

Early history 
The school was established by people of Midnapore. With the economic help of Tezchandra Mehtab Raybahadur, the school had started its journey with a few thatched huts and 18 students. The first headmaster was Rasiklal Sen and after just two years, the school got the honour of Governmental Zilla School in 1836. When Calcutta University was established in 1857, the school came under its supervision.

During the time of British Headmasters Sir F. Tydd and Mr. Sinclare, their thought about teaching was,"the interrogative system of teaching should be carefully pursued during every step of the scholar's progress as the simplest and most effectual means of conveying knowledge." 'Sahityasamrat' of Bengal, Rishi Bankim Chandra Chattopadhyay and his elder brother studied here.

Rajnarayan era 
Rajnarayan Bose, the socio-religious reformer and educationist took over the post of headmaster in 1851, and after 15 years retired in 1866. Another son of Medinipur, Sri Ishwar Chandra Vidyasagar who was then the Principal of Sanskrit college, Kolkata, received the order of Council of Education that Rajnarayan Bose, Professor of English Department, would be appointed as the fourth Headmaster of Midnapore School. Rajnarayan Bose was already a stalwart figure in the field of Brahmo Samaj movement and have been a Young Bengal leader. He took over the post of headmaster on 21 January 1851. He was a revolutionary educationist of that time as he had ushered in a complete redress in the  education system, i.e.,

He abolished corporal punishment and introduced a friendly and cooperative atmosphere among the teachers and students to make education more interesting to them.
He hated the procedure of "committing to memory and vomiting to paper". He followed the rule of teaching through interaction of both students and teachers. His eloquent speeches with humorous jokes attracted all students in the class. He put stress on interrogative teaching, so that the fundamentals of the student becomes strong.
He understood that the students also need physical exercise and sports so he made a lawn tennis court and a gymnasium in the school premises.
He observed that students sitting on benches without back-support cannot keep their backs straight, so their attention span becomes shorter while studying. So he introduced seats with back-supports for the first time.
Being an active leader of Young Bengal, he was moved by the 'Academic Association' of Henry Louis Vivian Derozio so he introduced Debate Associations and Mutual Improvement Association in school level.

Due to his ideas, the school was part of nationalist movements, widow-marriage, female education, Brahmo Samaj movements and many more socio-political activities. He was probably the first headmaster of any governmental school who had dared to inspire his students to join the freedom movement and even had hoisted the national flag on the school premises. He adorned the chair of Headmaster till 1866.

The age of nationalism 
The school in Midnapore was noted for nurturing the nationalist movement. Teachers like Hemchandra Kanungo, Gnanendranath Basu, Pyarilal Ghosh, were noted for their nationalist teachings. Khudiram Bose, probably the youngest martyr hanged, was an alumnus of the school. His 'guru' in this field was Satyendranath Basu, an alumnus as well as a teacher of this school. He smilingly took the hangman's noose on 11 August 1908. A statue of him can be seen in the school's garden now.

Khudiram's political master, Satyendranath Basu was hanged in the same year on 23 November. Another alumnus, Anathbandhu Panja went to the gallows in 1933. Tyrant District Magistrate James Peddie was shot dead on 7 April 1931, inside the school by two freedom fighters, Shri Bimal Dashgupta and Jatijiban Ghosh. One can still find this room in this school which had been reconstructed and inaugurated by the main suspect in the political-murder case, Bimal Dashgupta himself.

During those fiery days, the school had a student named Prabodh Kumar Bandopadhyay who secured first division with letter marks in compulsory and optional mathematics in 1926. But the world of Bengali Literature knows him in a different name, Manik Bandopadhyay.

Succession list of Principals

Notable alumni
 Manik Bandopadhyay - renowned  Bengali novelist
 Khudiram Bose - first martyr of Indian freedom movement.
 Sir Abdur Rahim - Muslim League politician and Justice.
 Dr.Hassan Suhrawardy - first Muslim Vice Chancellor of Calcutta University.
 Bankim Chandra Chattopadhyay - author of Vande Mataram
Anath Bondhu Panja

Notes

References 

Schools in Colonial India
High schools and secondary schools in West Bengal
Schools in Paschim Medinipur district
Educational institutions established in 1834
1834 establishments in India